The Battle of Courtrai (also known as the Second Battle of Belgium and the Battle of Roulers) was one of a series of offensives in northern France and southern Belgium that took place in late September and October 1918.

Background 
The  (GAF) comprising twelve Belgian divisions, ten divisions of the British Second Army and six divisions of the French Sixth Army, under the command of King Albert I of Belgium, with the French General Jean Degoutte as Chief of Staff, defeated the German 4th Army in the Fifth Battle of Ypres  The breaking of the Hindenburg Line further south, led the Allies to follow a strategy of pursuing the Germans for as long as possible, before movement was stopped by the winter rains. Mud and a collapse of the supply-system, had stopped the advance in early October but by the middle of the month, the GAF was ready to resume the offensive.

Battle
By the evening the British forces had reached high ground which dominated Werviq, Menen and Wevelghem in the south; further north the British captured Moorslede and closed up to Gulleghem and Steenbeek. Belgian troops on the left reached Iseghem, French troops surrounded Roulers and more Belgian troops captured Cortemarck.

Roulers fell the next day and by 16 October, the British held the north bank of the Lys up to Harelbeke and had crossed the river at several points. By 17 October, Thourout, Ostend, Lille and Douai had been recaptured; Bruges and Zeebrugge fell by 19 October and the Dutch border was reached the following day. The crossing of the Lys and the capture of Courtrai by the British Second Army on 19 October, led to a German retreat on the front of the Fifth Army further south, which encircled Lille on 18 October. Next day the British were in Roubaix and Tourcoing and by the evening of 22 October, the British had reached the Scheldt from Valenciennes to Avelghem.

Aftermath

A new offensive would be launched by the GAF on 30 October, which would be ended by the Armistice signed on 11 November. 

See also

 Battle of Courtrai (disambiguation), for other battles with this name
 Charge of Burkel, a skirmish between Belgian and German forces on 19 October 1918, notable as the last cavalry charge in Western Europe.

Footnotes

References

External links
 The Hundred Days, 18 July-11 November 1918
 Situation au Debut D'Octobre 1918 (in French)
 CWGC Map, Victory offensive 1918
 Eindoffensief (in Dutch), with a map of the advance day by day

Courtrai (1918)
Courtrai (1918)
Courtrai (1918)
Courtrai (1918)
Courtrai (1918)
Courtrai 1918
Conflicts in 1918
1918 in Belgium
Ypres Salient
History of Kortrijk
Battle honours of the King's Royal Rifle Corps
October 1918 events